Maschaug Pond is a coastal lagoon in Westerly, Washington County, Rhode Island, United States. A "small, brackish pond", it is not permanently connected to the Block Island Sound, and is largely bordered by the Misquamicut Club golf course. Nests of the piping plover, which has been federally designated as a threatened species, have been documented within the watershed.

The pond is non-tidal, except when breached by storms. The water directly receives about 57,219,222 gallons of precipitation per year, though groundwater flow is unknown. No rivers or streams flow into the pond. Maschaug Pond, like others in the region, was "formed after the recession of the glaciers 12,000 years ago".

As a result of certain environmental conditions, including low elevation of surrounding land and dense residential and commercial development, Maschaug Pond is considered particularly susceptible to storm surge. It is projected that during a future hurricane, Winnapaug and Maschaug Ponds will likely be significantly changed.

See also

List of lakes in Rhode Island
Geography of Rhode Island

References

External links

Maschaug Pond map
Water quality

Lagoons of Washington County, Rhode Island
Westerly, Rhode Island